Saraswati College is a secondary school in Dilkusha, Nausori in Fiji. The school has about 500+ students, and includes both academic programs and co-curricula activities.

The school celebrated its golden jubilee in 2016.

References

Educational institutions with year of establishment missing
Schools in Fiji
Tailevu Province